In logic, Nicod's axiom (named after the French logician and philosopher Jean Nicod) is a formula that can be used as the sole axiom of a semantically complete system of propositional calculus. The only connective used in the formulation of Nicod's axiom is the Sheffer's stroke.

The axiom has the following form:

((φ | (χ | ψ)) | ((τ | (τ | τ)) | ((θ | χ) | ((φ | θ) | (φ | θ)))))

Nicod showed that the whole propositional logic of Principia Mathematica could be derived from this axiom alone by using one inference rule, called "Nicod's modus ponens":

1. φ

2. (φ | (χ | ψ))

∴ ψ

In 1931, the Polish logician Mordechaj Wajsberg discovered an equally powerful and easier-to-work-with alternative:

((φ | (ψ | χ)) | (((τ | χ) | ((φ | τ) | (φ | τ))) | (φ | (φ | ψ))))

References

External links

Propositional calculus
Theorems in propositional logic

pl:aksjomat Nicoda-Łukasiewicza